Station Town is a village in County Durham, in England. It is situated to the south of Wingate, west of Hartlepool. Station Town is easily accessible, by road via the A19 and the B1280.

External links

Villages in County Durham